The 2010 European Road Championships were held in Ankara, Turkey, between 15 and 18 July 2010. The event consisted of a road race and a time trial for men and women under 23 and juniors. The championships were regulated by the European Cycling Union.

Schedule

Time trial 
Thursday 15 July
 12:00 Women under-23, 25.9 km
 15:00 Men juniors, 25.9 km

Friday 16 July
 12:00 Women juniors, 13.5 km
 15:00 Men under-23, 25.9 km

Road Race 
Saturday 17 July
 10:00 Men juniors, 148.5 km
 14:30 Women under-23, 121.5 km

Sunday 18 July
 10:00 Women juniors, 84.0 km
 14:00 Men under-23, 189.0 km

Results

Medal table

References 
Results uec-federation.eu

External links 
  

 
European Road Championships, 2010
2010 in Turkish sport
European Road Championships by year
2010
International cycle races hosted by Turkey
July 2010 sports events in Turkey